Alberta Provincial Highway No. 1, commonly referred to as Highway 1, is a major east–west highway in Southern Alberta that forms the southern mainline of the Trans-Canada Highway. It runs from the British Columbia border near Lake Louise through Calgary to the Saskatchewan border east of Medicine Hat. It continues as Highway 1 into both provinces. The route is a divided 4-lane expressway throughout the province with the exception of a section in central Calgary where it is an arterial thoroughfare and Urban Boulevard carrying 4 to 6 lanes. The highway is a freeway between the Sunshine exit near the town of Banff and Home Road in Calgary. Other rural sections have at grade intersections with Interchanges only at busier junctions. Twinning of the final  of Highway 1 between Lake Louise and the British Columbia border was completed by Parks Canada and opened to traffic on June 12, 2014 making the whole length of Alberta Highway 1 a divided minimum 4-lane route.

Route description 

Highway 1 is designated as a core route in Canada's National Highway System and is a core part of the developing Alberta Freeway Network.

British Columbia border to Calgary 

British Columbia Highway 1 becomes Alberta Highway 1 as it crosses Kicking Horse Pass into Alberta. It generally travels southeast along the wide Bow River valley through Banff National Park (Improvement District No. 9) crossing the Bow River three times. After descent from the pass with views of Mount Temple it crosses the Bow River. Its first junction is an interchange with Highway 93 north (the Icefields Parkway), which runs concurrent with Highway 1 for the next . Shortly after that Highway 1/93 crosses the Pipestone River passes through a single interchange servicing the Hamlet of Lake Louise, the Lake Louise Ski Resort and access to Lake Louise itself as well as Moraine Lake. From there the highway crosses the Bow River and travels along the west bank of the river passing by several trailheads until reaching the interchange for Highway 93 south (Banff–Radium Highway) which contributes significant eastbound traffic and is also a midpoint access to the Bow Valley Parkway. From there the highway continues past several more trailheads turn-offs (all at grade) with views of the Sawback Range. After passing an interchange for the Banff Sunshine Ski Area the highway bends to the east and approaches the town of Banff. The highway climbs up from the river and scales the side of a cliff above the town. A pullout at the top of the climb allows visitors to overlook Town of Banff, Vermilion Lakes and Mount Rundle. The highway then passes two interchanges servicing Banff and surrounding attractions. From there the highway bends to the southeast and leaves the park. The entire segment of Highway 1 through the national park is maintained by the Government of Canada, all sections of Banff Park highway have wildlife fences and overpasses to keep animals off the road.

Upon exiting Banff National Park, Highway 1 is maintained by Alberta Transportation for  until it reaches Calgary. This segment of the highway travels generally east through the rural municipalities of the Municipal District of Bighorn No. 8 and Rocky View County, It also briefly crosses a portion of Kananaskis Improvement District. Shortly after leaving Banff Park the highway passes through the Hamlet of Harvie Heights and the mountain town of Canmore which is serviced by four interchanges. Since many people from Canmore commute to Calgary weekly, traffic levels pick up after passing the town. From there the highway travels by the hamlets of Dead Man's Flats and Lac des Arcs each serviced by its own interchange. A rest area on the shore of Lac des Arcs provides access to the water. From there the highway exits the mountains passing the interchange for Highway 1X, a  connection to Highway 1A and access to Bow Valley Provincial Park. It then crosses the Kananaskis River and enters the Morley Reserve and passes the interchange for Alberta Highway 40, the main access to Kananaskis Country. From there the highway passes across the Morley Reserve and climbs a hill to a highpoint at Jack Lake Summit before descending to the prairies. From there it continues due east across level terrain and agricultural lands. As it approaches Calgary the highway passes an interchange at Highway 22 servicing the town of Cochrane and Bragg Creek, where traffic volumes double. Traffic continues to pick up as it passes through the Springbank semi-rural area until it arrives at the edge of Calgary itself. Highway 1A, the original Highway 1 from Canmore to Calgary, is an alternate route to this segment of Highway 1, providing access to the Hamlet of Exshaw, the Summer Village of Ghost Lake, and the Town of Cochrane.

Calgary 

In Calgary, Highway 1 is 16 Avenue N and maintained by the City of Calgary. Plans for a crosstown Highway 1 freeway were cancelled decades ago, leaving the city section of Highway 1 as primarily an urban arterial road, particularly in the Montgomery area and between Crowchild Trail and Deerfoot Trail (connected by a short limited-access section). Stoney Trail (Highway 201) provides an alternate controlled-access freeway route around the north side of the city and is the signed bypass of 16 Avenue. Despite being a longer distance, Highway 201 generally takes less time. Using Sarcee Trail, Glenmore Trail and Deerfoot Trails to access Highway 22X E which connects back to Highway 1 near Gleichen is another bypass of 16 Avenue and is commonly used by truckers to get through the city. It is shorter and faster than Stoney or 16th Avenue most times of the day, however it involves travels on freeways that are sometimes congested during rush hour.

Calgary to Saskatchewan border 
Upon exiting Calgary, Highway 1 is maintained by Alberta Transportation for  until it reaches the City of Medicine Hat. This segment of the highway generally travels in a southeast direction through the rural municipalities of Rocky View County, Wheatland County, the County of Newell, and Cypress County. For urban communities, this segment passes through the City of Chestermere and the Town of Strathmore, by the Town of Bassano, the City of Brooks, and the Hamlet of Suffield, and through the Town of Redcliff. Chestermere Boulevard (formerly Highway 1A), the original Highway 1 from Calgary to Chestermere, is an alternate route to initial portion of this segment of Highway 1.

Within Medicine Hat, Highway 1 is a controlled access highway with maintained by Alberta Transportation. The majority of the highway is a freeway; however, a section between the South Saskatchewan River and Seven Persons Creek still has a few at-grade intersections. East of Medicine Hat, Highway 1 is maintained by Alberta Transportation for  until it enters the Province of Saskatchewan, continuing as Saskatchewan Highway 1. This segment of the highway generally travels in an east direction through Cypress County. For urban communities, this segment passes through the Hamlet of Dunmore and by the hamlets of Irvine and Walsh. The speed limit on the highway east of Calgary is  except in some urbanized areas.

History 
A review of historical Alberta Official Road Maps shows that Highway 1 was numbered Highway 2 prior to 1941 (while Highway 2 as it is known today was numbered Highway 1 prior to 1941).

Exit numbering along Highway 1 began in 2005. As of March 2010, only the stretch of Highway 1 between Banff National Park and Calgary had been assigned exit numbers.

Between 1964 and 1972, a completely new route from Calgary to Canmore was built. The route included new overpasses, bridges, the Canmore Bypass, and 4-lane divided highway. In 1976, Parks Canada began twinning Highway 1 through Banff National Park, with the highway twinned to Banff by 1985 and to Castle Junction by 1997. Twinning of the  section between Castle Junction and the British Columbia border was completed in 2014, with the final  of Highway 1 between Lake Louise and the British Columbia border opening to traffic on June 12 of that year. Between 1973 and 1990 the highway was twinned from Calgary to the Saskatchewan Border.

Future 
Alberta Transportation has long term, conceptual plans for Highway 1 to have a phased upgrade to a freeway standard within its area of jurisdiction (outside Banff National Park and Calgary city limits). Currently, areas that have been studied are a proposed interchange located between Garden Road and Conrich Road, Rainbow Road near Chestermere, and Highway 36 near Brooks. There is not timeline for construction of these interchanges.

Strathmore 
Alberta Transportation has plans for a bypass around the Town of Strathmore. Initial proposals included a realignment northwest of Gleichen, continuing west to run south of Eagle Lake and then continuing northwest where it will rejoined the existing alignment near Cheadle, between Highway 24 and Strathmore, as well as a link to the Highway 22X corridor. There is no timeline for construction.

Medicine Hat 
The Trans-Canada Highway has a few remaining signalized intersections within Medicine Hat, and Alberta Transportation is studying both a long-term realignment of Highway 1, as well as possible upgrades to the existing alignment. Possible upgrades to the existing alignment include a new interchange at 1 Street SW and intersection closures at 6 Street SW and 16 Street SW. There is no timeline for the bypass construction or any upgrades to the existing alignment.

Major intersections

See also 

Trans-Canada Highway

References

External links

001
Alberta 001
001
Banff, Alberta
Brooks, Alberta
Medicine Hat
Roads in Calgary